The 2002 Belarusian Premier League was the 12th season of top-tier football in Belarus. It started on April 12 and ended on November 8, 2002. Belshina Bobruisk were the defending champions.

Team changes from 2001 season
Teams finished on the last two places in 2001 – Naftan Novopolotsk and Vedrich-97 Rechytsa relegated to the First League. They were replaced by 2001 First League winners Torpedo Zhodino and the newcomers, First League runners-up Zvezda-VA-BGU Minsk. Neman-Belcard Grodno changed their name back to Neman Grodno.

Overview
BATE Borisov and Neman Grodno finished the season with equal number of points and advanced to the Championship Play-Off. BATE won the play-off game and became the champions for the 2nd time. They qualified for the next season's Champions League. Neman Grodno and 2002–03 Cup winners Dinamo Minsk qualified for UEFA Cup. Due to Premiere League expansion from 14 to 16 teams starting with next season, only one lowest placed team (Lokomotiv-96 Vitebsk) have relegated.

Teams and venues

Table

Championship play-off

Results

Belarusian clubs in European Cups

Top scorers

See also
2002 Belarusian First League
2001–02 Belarusian Cup
2002–03 Belarusian Cup

External links
RSSSF

Belarusian Premier League seasons
1
Belarus
Belarus